The Town of Brisbane colonial by-election, 1865 was a by-election held on 23 November 1865 in the electoral district of Town of Brisbane for the Queensland Legislative Assembly.

History
In November 1865, Charles Blakeney, member for Town of Brisbane, resigned, having accepted an appointment as a District Court judge in the Western District. George Raff won the resulting by-election unopposed on 23 November 1865.

See also
 Members of the Queensland Legislative Assembly, 1863–1867

References

1865 elections in Australia
Queensland state by-elections
19th century in Brisbane